ENAC may refer to:

  - the French civil aviation university
 Epithelial sodium channel (ENaC) 
 Italian Civil Aviation Authority
  - School of Architecture, Civil and Environmental Engineering at EPFL